Berthier is a surname. Notable people with the surname include:

Alexandre Berthier (1638–1708), French officer posted to Canada
Guillaume-François Berthier (1704–1782), Jesuit writer 
Jacques Berthier (1923–1994), Taizé composer
Jean-Marie Berthier (1940 - 8 August 2017), French poet
Louis-Alexandre Berthier (1753–1815), Marshal of France under Napoleon
Pierre Berthier (1782–1861), geologist